Caryocolum nepalense is a moth of the family Gelechiidae. It is found in Nepal. It occurs at altitudes between 1,500 and 3,800 meters.

The length of the forewings is 5.5-6.5 mm for males and 5–6 mm for females. The forewings are dark brown, evenly mottled with white scales. There are a number of white markings. Adults have been recorded on wing from early April to early July and from late October to early November, possibly in two generations per year.

References

Moths described in 1968
nepalense
Moths of Asia